Vav or VAV may refer to :

Places 
 Vav, Gujarat, a city and taluka in Gujarat
 Vav State, a princely state in Banas Kantha (Kathiawar) named after its above capital
 Vav (Vidhan Sabha constituency), Gujarat

Other 
 Vav (letter), a Semitic letter
 Vav (protein)
 VAV (band), a South Korean boy band
 Variable air volume, used in HVAC systems
 Varli language (ISO 639 code: vav), a language of India
 Victor and Valentino, Cartoon Network's animated television series
 Vis-à-vis (disambiguation)
 Stepwell, called vav in Gujarati and Marwari